John Michael Montgomery is the third studio album by the American country music artist of the same name. Singles released from this album include "I Can Love You Like That", "Sold (The Grundy County Auction Incident)", "No Man's Land", "Cowboy Love" and "Long as I Live". Respectively, these reached #1, #1, #3, #4, and #4 on the Hot Country Songs charts; "Sold" was also declared the Number One country song of 1995 by Billboard.

The track "Holdin' Onto Somethin'" was also recorded by Jeff Carson on his 1995 self-titled debut album, from which it was released as a single in 1996.

Track listing

Personnel
Bill Cuomo – synthesizer on "I Can Love You Like That", "High School Heart", "Long as I Live", and "Heaven Sent Me You"
Paul Franklin – steel guitar on all tracks
Barry Green – trombone on "Just Like a Rodeo"
Rob Hajacos – fiddle on all tracks except "I Can Love You Like That", "Holdin' Onto Something", and "No Man's Land"
Dann Huff – electric guitar on all tracks except "Sold (The Grundy County Auction Incident)" and "Just Like A Rodeo"
John Barlow Jarvis – piano on all tracks
Brent Mason – electric guitar on all tracks
Terry McMillan – harmonica on "Sold (The Grundy County Auction Incident)", suspended cymbal on "I Can Love You Like That" and "Long as I Live", tambourine on "Holdin' Onto Something"
John Michael Montgomery – lead vocals on all tracks
John Wesley Ryles – backing vocals on all tracks except "I Can Love You Like That", "High School Heart", "Long as I Live", and "No Man's Land"
Dennis Solee – tenor saxophone on "Just Like a Rodeo"
Harry Stinson – backing vocals on "I Can Love You Like That", "High School Heart", "Long as I Live", and "No Man's Land"
George Tidwell – trumpet on "Just Like a Rodeo"
Billy Joe Walker, Jr. – acoustic guitar on all tracks, electric guitar on "Holdin' Onto Something"
Dennis Wilson – backing vocals on all tracks except "Cowboy Love" and "It's What I Am"
Lonnie Wilson – drums on all tracks
Glenn Worf – bass guitar on all tracks

Horns on "Just Like a Rodeo" arranged by Buddy Skipper.

Chart performance

References

1995 albums
Albums produced by Scott Hendricks
Atlantic Records albums
John Michael Montgomery albums